Group C of UEFA Women's Euro 2022 was played from 9 to 17 July 2022. The pool was originally made up of the Netherlands, Sweden, Switzerland and Russia. Following the Russian invasion of Ukraine, Russia was banned from participating and Portugal replaced them.

Teams

Notes

Standings

Matches

Portugal vs Switzerland

Netherlands vs Sweden

Sweden vs Switzerland

Netherlands vs Portugal

Switzerland vs Netherlands

Sweden vs Portugal

Discipline
Fair play points will be used as tiebreakers in the group if the overall and head-to-head records of teams were tied. These are calculated based on yellow and red cards received in all group matches as follows:

 first yellow card: plus 1 point;
 indirect red card (second yellow card): plus 3 points;
 direct red card: plus 4 points;
 yellow card and direct red card: plus 5 points;

References

External links

Group C